Highway 13 (AR 13, Ark. 13 and Hwy. 13) is a designation for three state highways in the central part of the U.S. state of Arkansas. The longest segment of  travels from U.S. Route 79 (US 79) in Humphrey to Campground Road east of Beebe. There exists two short segments in White County; one traveling  from Highway 367 in McRae to Highway 36 in Searcy and the other traveling  from Highway 367 in Judsonia to Highway 258.

The southern part of Highway 13 was replaced by Highway 81 during World War II. Then, in 1989, when US 425 was commissioned, it replaced most of Highway 81.

Route description

Beebe to Humphrey

Highway 13 starts east of Beebe and heads south to Highway 38 at Hickory Plains, and a crossing of both I-40 and US 70 in Carlisle. The route continues south to US 165 in Humnoke and to US 63/US 79 at Humphrey, where the route terminates.

McRae to Highway 385
The route begins in McRae at Highway 367 and runs north across US 64/US 67/US 167 (Future I-57), which are concurrent. Highway 13 is Exit 35 on the converged highways. The highway crosses Highway 267 at a four way stop then heads north onto the newly completed (as of spring 2016) Highway 13 south bypass to join with the former Honey Hill Rd to Highway 36 (Beebe Capps Expressway) at the western city limit of Searcy. The road continued on the newly completed (as of May 29, 2018) Highway 16 to end at Highway 385.

Judsonia to Highway 258
The route begins at Highway 367 near Friendly Acres Park and runs west as Missile Base Road. Highway 13 meets US 64/US 67/US 167 (Future I-57) at a grade-separated interchange north of Judsonia. After this bridging, AR 13 turns north to intersect Highway 157 before terminating at Highway 258 near the Emmett Miller House.

History
Highway 13 was one of the original 1926 state highways. The section from Arkansas Highway 38 to US 70 was designated in 1941. In 1945, the original portion of the route was renumbered Highway 81, which this section was replaced by U.S. Route 425 when it was commissioned in 1989. The route extended north to Beebe and south to Humphrey later. In 1994, the road replaced the two sections of Arkansas Highway 371 from McRae to Highway 267 and from Judsonia to Highway 258 to avoid conflict with the newly designated US 371

Major intersections

See also

 List of state highways in Arkansas

References

External links

013
Transportation in Arkansas County, Arkansas
Transportation in Jefferson County, Arkansas
Transportation in Lonoke County, Arkansas
Transportation in Prairie County, Arkansas
Transportation in White County, Arkansas